Karaman Castle is in the city of Karaman, Turkey.

The castle is on a tumulus, although its altitude is  it is not much higher than the surrounding city.

The castle was probably built in the 11th or 12th century by the Byzantine Empire. It was captured by the Seljuks of Anatolia, Karamanids and finally the Ottoman Empire. The Ottomans restored the castle in 1465.

The castle consists of three concentric ramparts. The innermost rampart takes the form of a keep-like citadel with nine bastions; four circular and five rectangular. Until the mid-20th century much of the town of Karaman was still contained within the outermost ramparts - since then every building within the outer ramparts has been demolished and the entire area is now a public park.

External links
Virtual tour

References

History of Karaman Province
Tourist attractions in Karaman Province
11th-century establishments in the Byzantine Empire
Byzantine fortifications in Turkey